Uladzimir Harakhavik (born 21 January 1995) is a Belarusian cyclist, who currently rides for Belarusian amateur team Vivarovar.

Major results

2014
 1st  Mountains classification Baltic Chain Tour
2015
 1st Sochi Cup
 5th Grand Prix Minsk
 8th Maykop–Ulyap–Maykop
 10th Grand Prix Sarajevo
2016
 9th Grand Prix Minsk
2017
 9th Grand Prix Minsk
2018
 8th Race Horizon Park Maidan
2019
 4th Minsk Cup
 6th Grand Prix Minsk
 9th Entre Brenne et Montmorillonnais

References

External links

1995 births
Living people
Belarusian male cyclists
Cyclists from Minsk